The 2015 UST Growling Tigers men's basketball team represented University of Santo Tomas in the 78th season of the University Athletic Association of the Philippines. The men's basketball tournament for the school year 2015-16 began on September 5, 2015 and the host school for the season was the University of the Philippines.

UST made it back to the playoffs after getting eliminated in Season 77. They finished the double round-robin eliminations at first place with 11 wins against 3 losses. The FEU Tamaraws had the same win–loss record but were ranked lower on an inferior -10 quotient. The last time that the Tigers got the top seed was in 1995 when they won their third straight championship. It was also the last time that they won as many as 11 games at the end of eliminations in a season.

They had a twice-to-beat advantage over their Final Four opponent and defending champions, the NU Bulldogs who they defeated in one game to advance to the Finals against FEU. NU has been the Tigers' semifinal opponent for the third time in the last four years. UST became the fifth team in UAAP history to reach the Finals after missing the Final Four playoffs in the previous season.

In Game Two of the Finals series, Kevin Ferrer's 24 points in the third quarter broke the UAAP record for most points scored in a period. He tied his career-high of 29 points in their 62–56 win over FEU to extend the series to a deciding Game Three. In that game, UST was also able to limit the Tamaraws to their lowest scoring output, as they have not scored lower than 60 points in the season. FEU won the series in three games, ending a decade-long wait to claim their 20th men's basketball championship. The Tigers who had faced FEU in the Finals for the first time since 1979 won both games against them in the elimination rounds.

UST recorded the most three point shots made in the season with 89 for a league-best 31% field goal percentage. They also held the highest free throw conversion of 68.4% among all teams.

Graduating players Ferrer and Ed Daquioag were included in the Mythical team selection during the presentation of awards. Ferrer was chosen back-to-back Player of the Week by the UAAP Press Corps for the duration of September 23–27 and on the week of September 30-October 4, while Daquioag received the citation for the period of September 9–13.

Roster

Depth chart

Roster changes

Subtractions

Additions

Recruiting class

Coaching staff 
Estong Ballesteros, the Growling Tigers' assistant coach for offense and trainer has resigned from his post. He had informed head coach Bong dela Cruz of his decision to concentrate on coaching the Philippine National Police basketball team in the MBL and as deputy to Lawrence Chongson at Tanduay in the PBA D-League.

Rene Baena was hired to replace Ballesteros. The veteran coach who was a member of UST's track and field team was an assistant coach of the Adamson Baby Falcons juniors' basketball team. He has coached the juniors teams of La Salle Greenhills, Ateneo U13, and the San Beda Red Cubs in the past. He has also served as an assistant coach of the UE Red Warriors team that made it to the UAAP Finals in 2009.

Four-time Philippine Basketball Association MVP Alvin Patrimonio has also come on board as consultant and trainer of the team's big men.

Injuries 
Forwards Joco Macaseat and Regie Boy Basibas were excluded from the roster with both suffering from year-long injuries. Macasaet tore his ACL while lifting weights in the offseason, while Basibas had some issues with his groin.

Karim Abdul, Louie Vigil, and Kyle Suarez also fell to various injures in the summer, but all three were able to play in the UAAP. Abdul underwent surgery on his left knee in April to have his bone spurs removed. Vigil failed to suit for the Tigers in the Filoil Flying V tournament as he got sidelined by a hamstring injury, and while Suarez was able to play after recovering from an ACL injury in December, he reinjured it during a game against the De La Salle Green Archers in the first round.

Mario Bonleon and Renzo Subido also missed games during the season. Bonleon hurt his finger during practice and was not able to play against the Adamson Falcons in the first round, while Subido also had an ACL injury before their Finals series with FEU.

Schedule and results

Preseason tournaments

UAAP games 

Elimination games were played in a double round-robin format. All games were aired on ABS-CBN Sports and Action and Balls. The second game of the Finals series was aired on ABS-CBN and Balls.

Postseason tournament 
The Philippine Collegiate Champions League games were aired on ABS-CBN Sports and Action.

Notes

UAAP statistics

Eliminations 

|- bgcolor="#ffffdd"
| Kevin Ferrer || 14 || 14 || 31.5 || 71 || 177 || 40.1% || 32 || 92 || 34.8% || 77 || 99 || 77.8% || 8.2 || 1.6 || 0.9 || 0.4 || 2.2 || style=|17.9
|-
| Ed Daquioag || 14 || 14 || style=|34.5 || 89 || 211 || 42.2% || 7 || 41 || 17.1% || 45 || 66 || 68.2% || 5.6 || 2.2 || style=|1.1 || 0.8 || 3.4 || 16.4
|- bgcolor="#ffffdd"
| Karim Abdul || 14 || 14 || 29.4 || 59 || 136 || 43.4% || 2 || 5 || 40.0% || 57 || 86 || 66.3% || style=|8.4 || 1.2 || 0.5 || style=|1.2 || 2.4 || 12.6
|-
| Louie Vigil || 14 || 8 || 24.1 || 49 || 115 || 42.6% || 11 || 42 || 26.2% || 21 || 35 || 60.0% || 4.8 || style=|2.5 || 0.4 || 0.4 || 2.1 || 9.3
|- bgcolor="#ffffdd"
| Marvin Lee || 14 || 2 || 19.8 || 25 || 62 || 40.3% || 14 || 37 || 37.8% || 23 || 29 || style=|79.3% || 2.9 || 0.6 || style=|1.1 || 0.0 || 1.6 || 6.2
|-
| Mario Bonleon || 13 || 6 || 16.6 || 23 || 58 || 39.7% || 8 || 23 || 34.8% || 4 || 7 || 57.1% || 2.4 || 0.8 || 0.0 || 0.2 || 1.8 || 4.5
|- bgcolor="#ffffdd"
| Kent Lao || 14 || 2 || 17.1 || 15 || 51 || 29.4% || 11 || 34 || 32.4% || 6 || 9 || 66.7% || 2.9 || 0.4 || 0.1 || 0.1 || 0.6 || 3.4
|-
| Jon Sheriff || 14 || 10 || 17.2 || 11 || 44 || 25.0% || 0 || 0 || 0.0% || 10 || 25 || 40.0% || 2.4 || 2.1 || 0.6 || 0.0 || 0.7 || 2.3
|- bgcolor="#ffffdd"
| Kyle Suarez || 6 || 0 || 14.3 || 3 || 5 || 66.0% || 3 || 3 || style=|100.0% || 0 || 0 || 0.0% || 0.3 || 0.2 || 0.0 || 0.0 || 0.5 || 1.5
|-
| Renzo Subido || 12 || 0 || 5.9 || 2 || 13 || 15.4% || 1 || 9 || 11.1% || 3 || 4 || 75.0% || 0.4 || 0.8 || 0.1 || 0.0 || 0.5 || 0.7
|- bgcolor="#ffffdd"
| Jeepy Faundo || 10 || 0 || 3.1 || 1 || 1 || style=|100.0% || 0 || 0 || 0.0% || 3 || 4 || 75.0% || 0.6 || 0.0 || 0.1 || 0.2 || 0.0 || 0.5
|-
| Zach Huang || 6 || 0 || 2.3 || 0 || 1 || 0.0% || 0 || 0 || 0.0% || 0 || 0 || 0.0% || 0.3 || 0.0 || 0.0 || 0.0 || 0.2 || 0.0
|- bgcolor="#ffffdd"
| Justin Arana || 2 || 0 || 1.2 || 0 || 0 || 0.0% || 0 || 0 || 0.0% || 0 || 0 || 0.0% || 0.0 || 0.0 || 0.0 || 0.0 || 0.0 || 0.0
|-
| Janrey Garrido || 6 || 0 || 0.8 || 0 || 2 || 0.0% || 0 || 1 || 0.0% || 0 || 0 || 0.0% || 0.2 || 0.0 || 0.0 || 0.0 || 0.3 || 0.0
|- bgcolor="#ffffdd"
| Enric Caunan || 4 || 0 || 0.6 || 0 || 1 || 0.0% || 0 || 0 || 0.0% || 0 || 0 || 0.0% || 0.0 || 0.0 || 0.0 || 0.0 || 0.0 || 0.0
|-
| Ama Abdurasad || 4 || 0 || 0.5 || 0 || 0 || 0.0% || 0 || 0 || 0.0% || 0 || 0 || 0.0% || 0.0 || 0.0 || 0.0 || 0.0 || 0.0 || 0.0
|- class="sortbottom"
! Total || 14 || || 40.0 || 348 || 877 || 39.7% || 89 || 287 || 31.0% || 249 || 364 || 68.4% || 40.6 || 11.9 || 4.9 || 3.2 || 16.4 || 73.9
|- class="sortbottom"
! Opponents || 14 || || 40.0 || 345 || 908 || 38.0% || 78 || 299 || 26.1% || 198 || 307 || 64.5% || 44.1 || 13.1 || 3.4 || 3.1 || 18.7 || 69.0
|}

Playoffs 

|- bgcolor=#ffffdd
| Kevin Ferrer || 4 || 4 || style=|34.8 || 22 || 59 || 37.3% || 9 || 30 || style=|30.0% || 8 || 15 || 53.3% || 6.3 || 1.3 || 0.5 || 1.0 || 1.8 || style=|15.3
|-
| Karim Abdul || 4 || 4 || 31.2 || 14 || 40 || 35.0% || 0 || 0 || 0.0% || 20 || 29 || 69.0% || style=|7.3 || 1.0 || 0.0 || style=|1.3 || 3.0 || 12.0
|- bgcolor=#ffffdd
| Ed Daquioag || 4 || 4 || 32.9 || 15 || 46 || 32.6% || 1 || 9 || 11.1% || 12 || 16 || 75.0% || 5.8 || 2.0 || style=|1.0 || 1.0 || 3.5 || 10.8
|-
| Louie Vigil || 4 || 4 || 28.7 || 16 || 50 || 32.0% || 2 || 16 || 12.5% || 4 || 7 || 57.1% || 6.3 || style=|2.5 || style=|1.0 || 0.5 || 1.0 || 9.5
|- bgcolor=#ffffdd
| Marvin Lee || 4 || 0 || 17.6 || 6 || 16 || 37.5% || 3 || 13 || 23.1% || 7 || 9 || style=|77.8% || 2.3 || 1.3 || 0.0 || 0.0 || 1.3 || 5.5
|-
| Mario Bonleon || 4 || 0 || 16.4 || 7 || 14 || 50.0% || 2 || 7 || 28.6% || 0 || 0 || 0.0% || 2.0 || 0.0 || 0.0 || 0.0 || 0.5 || 4.0
|- bgcolor=#ffffdd
| Jon Sheriff || 4 || 3 || 15.0 || 6 || 11 || style=|54.5% || 0 || 0 || 0.0% || 4 || 12 || 33.3% || 3.0 || 0.5 || 0.5 || 0.0 || 0.8 || 4.0
|-
| Kent Lao || 4 || 1 || 18.0 || 2 || 14 || 14.3% || 1 || 10 || 10.0% || 3 || 4 || 75.0% || 1.5 || 0.0 || 0.3 || 0.0 || 0.3 || 2.0
|- bgcolor=#ffffdd
| Zach Huang || 2 || 0 || 4.4 || 0 || 0 || 0.0% || 0 || 0 || 0.0% || 0 || 0 || 0.0% || 0.5 || 0.0 || 0.5 || 0.0 || 0.0 || 0.0
|-
| Jeepy Faundo || 4 || 0 || 3.2 || 0 || 0 || 0.0% || 0 || 0 || 0.0% || 0 || 2 || 0.0% || 1.5 || 0.0 || 0.0 || 0.0 || 0.3 || 0.0
|- class=sortbottom
! Total || 4 ||  || 40.0 || 88 || 250 || 35.2% || 18 || 85 || 21.2% || 58 || 94 || 61.7% || 39.0 || 8.5 || 3.5 || 3.8 || 12.5 || 63.0
|- class=sortbottom
! Opponents || 4 ||  || 40.0 || 83 || 259 || 32.0% || 18 || 90 || 20.0% || 69 || 97 || 71.1% || 50.8 || 10.0 || 2.0 || 3.3 || 17.3 || 63.3
|}

Source: HumbleBola

Awards

Players drafted into the PBA

References 

UST Growling Tigers
UST Growling Tigers basketball team seasons